Saint George Maronite Cathedral is the cathedral of the Maronite Catholic Archeparchy of Beirut, Archdiocese of the city of Beirut, Lebanon. Its construction, with a Neoclassical facade, interior and plan inspired by the Basilica di Santa Maria Maggiore, began in 1884 and ended in 1894.

The cathedral was heavily hit and shelled during the Lebanese civil war and was plundered and defaced. A number of works of art that were looted have since been recovered, including the famous painting by Eugène Delacroix representing Saint George, the patron saint of the cathedral and of the Archdiocese of the city of Beirut. The cathedral was restored after the end of the hostilities and was re-inaugurated by the Maronite Patriarch Nasrallah Boutros Sfeir on 24 April 2000.

Construction

The Cathedral of Saint George was built by Monsignor Joseph Debs, the Archbishop of Beirut, on the site of an earlier church that was also dedicated to the same saint. The earlier structure was built in 1755 to serve the Maronites of Beirut. Work began in 1884 using Roman columns from the temple of Deir El Qalaa in Beit Mery. The edifice was completed and consecrated on Palm Sunday in 1894. Built on the plan of a basilica with its nave and two lateral aisles separated by two rows of columns, the cathedral has a façade of neo-classical style designed by Italian architect Giuseppe Maggiore. The interior bears a general resemblance to that of Santa Maria Maggiore in Rome.

The nave is covered with a coffered ceiling with gilded and a double wooden structure, covered with golden leaves on a beige background. The walls are decorated with stucco and marble. Above the main altar is a canopy four columns. At the rear, in the choir, is the cathedra (bishop throne) of the Archbishop of Beirut, and the chair used by Pope John Paul II during his pastoral visit to Lebanon in 1997.

Architecture
Inspired by the Basilica of Santa Maria Maggiore in Rome, Saint George Maronite Cathedral was built between 1884 and 1894, and inaugurated by Bishop Youssef Debs. Prior to this, the Maronite community of Beirut had made use of a small church that stood nearby and dated back to 1753. In 1954, engineer Antoun Tabet undertook restoration works inside the cathedral. Originally planned in the shape of a cross, its transept was shortened and arches added at either end. Badly damaged during the Lebanese Civil War (1975–1990), the cathedral was completely rehabilitated by 1997, recovering its original Renaissance cruciform shape. It was inaugurated in April 2000.  Beneath the forecourt of the cathedral's annex, significant archaeological remains have been unearthed and preserved. They include a Hellenistic structure, part of the Roman Decumanus Maximus colonnaded street, and an Ottoman wall.

On 19 November 2016, Beirut Archbishop Paul Matar inaugurated the new campanile which took a decade to construct. According to the archbishop, the reduction in the campanile's height to stand equal to that of the minarets of the adjacent Mohammad Al-Amin Mosque aims to send a message of interfaith solidarity and harmony.

On 4 August 2020, the cathedral was damaged in the Beirut explosions that ripped Beirut port. Beirut was a huge chaos back then, which left behind homeless families, scattered houses and unsheltered people. Specifically, the cathedral was highly affected by the blast. Doors and windows were burst and dispersed, stained glass along with their deformed frames were scattered all over the place. The cathedral also suffered from a damaged pitched roof where bricks were broken or misplaced and exposed cracks became visible in beams and marbling paints. The ceiling was also affected where some panels were out of place, suspended mid-air or completely fallen off. Electrical, lighting and sound fixtures were either damaged or disconnected. After the explosion, volunteers took prompt actions such as cleaning the place, mobilizing furniture as well as sorting the damaged elements and organizing the undamaged ones. The renovation process was launched due to the funding of many donors from Lebanon and other countries. Fortunately, despite the endless destructions the cathedral had been struggling with, there is always someone taking care of this historical and spiritual place and bringing back its main significant symbol of the presence of the Maronites in the Capital of Lebanon and their expansion throughout the Lebanese territory.

Location

The Church of Saint George is located in the downtown area of Beirut. It is one of the most important religious buildings of the city. Right next to her is the Sunni Mohammad Al-Amin Mosque. About eighty meters north is the Saint George Greek Orthodox Cathedral of the Greek Orthodox Church of Antioch.

Timeline
1884–1894: Construction of the cathedral, which was inspired by the Basilica Santa Maria Maggiore in Rome.

1954: Restoration works inside the cathedral undertaken by Antoun Tabet.

1975–1990: Civil War badly damaged the cathedral.

1997: Post war rehabilitation of the Cathedral led to the recovery of its original Renaissance cruciform shape. Significant archaeological remains were unearthed and preserved.

April 2000: Cathedral inauguration.

19 November 2016: Campanile inauguration.

4 August 2020: Beirut explosions damaged the cathedral.

See also
Beirut Central District
Maronite Church
Maronite Christianity in Lebanon
Christianity in Lebanon
Basilica di Santa Maria Maggiore
Garden of Forgiveness

Further reading
 Tubiya ABI 'AD, Katidra'iya Mar Jirjis al-Maruniya, Beirut: Chahine Printing Press, 2000.

Sources

 Kassir, Samir (2003) Histoire de Beyrouth, Fayard, Paris. , Les lieux de culte au Liban. Ministère du Tourisme, Beyrouth.

References

External links
 https://commons.wikimedia.org/wiki/File:Grabung_arch%C3%A4ologisches_museum_st_georg_beirut.jpg

Eastern Catholic cathedrals in Lebanon
Cathedrals in Beirut
Catholic churches in Beirut
Churches completed in 1894
1890 architecture
19th-century Maronite Church church buildings
Maronite church buildings in Lebanon
Maronite cathedrals
1890s establishments in Ottoman Syria
2020 Beirut explosion